Aufdenblatten is a surname:

 Alex Aufdenblatten, former Swiss curler
 Alfred Aufdenblatten (1897-1975), Swiss mountaineer, ski guide and cross country skier
 Fränzi Aufdenblatten (born 1962), retired Swiss World Cup alpine ski racer

German-language surnames